Springfield Township is one of eleven townships in LaGrange County, Indiana. As of the 2010 census, its population was 1,179 and it contained 469 housing units.

History
Springfield Township was founded in 1834.

The John O'Ferrell Store at Mongo was listed on the National Register of Historic Places in 1975.

Geography

References

External links
 Indiana Township Association
 United Township Association of Indiana

Townships in LaGrange County, Indiana
Townships in Indiana